Robert James Foth  (born July 3, 1958) is an American sport shooter. He was born in Buffalo, New York. He won a silver medal in 50 metre rifle three positions at the 1992 Summer Olympics in Barcelona. Foth was born in Buffalo, New York.

References

1958 births
Living people
Sportspeople from Buffalo, New York
American male sport shooters
United States Distinguished Marksman
Olympic silver medalists for the United States in shooting
Shooters at the 1988 Summer Olympics
Shooters at the 1992 Summer Olympics
Medalists at the 1992 Summer Olympics
Pan American Games medalists in shooting
Pan American Games silver medalists for the United States
Pan American Games bronze medalists for the United States
Shooters at the 1987 Pan American Games
Medalists at the 1987 Pan American Games
20th-century American people
21st-century American people